We're No Bad Guys aka. We Are No Bad Guys (愛上百份百英雄) is a 1997 Action Hong Kong film directed by Wong Jing.

Synopsis
Plane (Ekin Cheng), a troubled cop who hits the skids when his girlfriend Carrie (Gigi Leung) is killed by a stoic hitman named Angel (Alex Fong). One year later he finds himself saddled with new partner Turkey (Jordan Chan), an immature cop who is in love with up-and-coming idol singer Tinny Chung (Vivian Hsu). There are the usual growing pains as the two partners learn to like and trust one another. Plane meets Tinny's friend Mandy, her looks resemble Carrie's and they fall in love. Angel then returns to settle old scores.

Cast
 Ekin Cheng - Plane
 Jordan Chan - Turkey Chu
 Gigi Leung - Carrie / Mandy
 Vivian Hsu - Tinny Chung
 Alex Fong Chung-Sun - Angel
 Law Kar-ying - Bond Chu
 Meg Lam Kin-Ming - Plane's mom
 Michael Chan Wai-Man - Officer Mike
 Jue Wing-Lung 	  	 
 Berg Ng - Golden Teeth
 William Duen Wai-Lun - Officer Pei
 Spencer Lam	  	 
 Lee Siu-kei - Chan Chi Fook
 Lee Kin-yan - Robert
 Ricky Yi Fan-Wai - Officer Tim

External links
 IMDb entry

Hong Kong action films
1997 films
1990s Hong Kong films